Kingdom of Comfort is the ninth and final studio album by the British Christian rock band Delirious?, released in the United States on 1 April 2008 and in the United Kingdom on 14 April 2008.

History
Inspired by visits to India with Joyce Meyer Ministries, Delirious? decided to place the focus of the album on inequality and justice around the world. Guitarist Stu G. said, Seeing children looking for scraps on the rubbish dump they call homes in Cambodia and the education and feeding projects in the slums of Mumbai India really had an impact on us. It wasn't possible to simply proceed with business as usual. We had to ask ourselves, 'What am I building? A kingdom of comfort? Or a kingdom of heaven?'He also stated later that the title of the album was inspired from a sermon by Rob Bell, author and pastor of Mars Hill Bible Church.

When the band returned to the studio, they began the process of writing and recording the record. An improvised section, often played during the band's song "History Maker", was adapted to form "God Is Smiling". "Wonder" was written by Martin Smith about a child whom his family came close to adopting. "We Give You Praise" was written in collaboration with Hillsong worship leader Marty Sampson. "Break the Silence" was also written with ex-Snow Patrol musician Iain Archer. Fifteen songs were recorded in total, and twelve were selected for the final album. The band released the second track, "God Is Smiling", as an MP3 download from their official website on 1 November 2007; it had been downloaded over 10,000 times by January 2008. Another free download from the album, "We Give You Praise", was released on 1 February 2008. Upon the release of the album, two more tracks were also made available for free download from the band's official website—"Hallelujah" and "Mothers of the Night". One song, "Fill My Cup", has not been released by Delirious?, but appears on the Compassionart album and features vocals by Delirious? lead vocalist Martin Smith.

Reception 

Christian magazine Christian Today stated that the album "questions everything, from cancer to consumerism, 'five star' dreams to slums and poverty. It is an album that calls for sacrifice, social justice and love." It has also stated that "Kingdom of Comfort is yet another homerun (sic) for Delirious, with amped up modern rock production, some challenging lyrics meant to inspired by social action, and more stirring songs of worship."
Cross Rhythms gave the album ten out of ten, stating that it was "one of the most raw, passionate albums that these Christian rock titans have ever released".

Track listing
 "Kingdom of Comfort" (Martin Smith, Stuart Garrard, Jon Thatcher) – 3:29
 "God Is Smiling" (Smith, Garrard, Thatcher) – 4:09
 "Give What You've Got" (Smith, Garrard, Thatcher) – 3:32
 "Love Will Find a Way" (Smith, Garrard, Thatcher) – 4:29
 "Eagle Rider" (Smith, Garrard, Thatcher) – 4:11
 "We Give You Praise" (Smith, Garrard, Thatcher, Marty Sampson) – 5:13
 "How Sweet the Name" (Smith, Garrard, Thatcher) – 5:42
 "Wonder" (Smith, Garrard, Thatcher) – 4:13
 "Break the Silence" (Smith, Garrard, Thatcher, Iain Archer) – 4:12
 "Stare the Monster Down" (Smith, Garrard, Thatcher) – 3:27
 "All God's Children" (Smith, Garrard, Thatcher) – 5:51
 "My Soul Sings" (Smith, Garrard, Thatcher) – 6:59
 "We Give You Praise (Radio Mix)" (Smith, Garrard, Thatcher, Marty Sampson) – 4:03 (US version only)
 "Hallelujah" (Smith, Garrard, Thatcher) – 4:39 (download only)
 "Mothers of the Night" (Smith, Garrard, Thatcher) – 5:28 (download only)

Personnel 
Delirious?
 Martin Smith – lead vocals, guitars, additional keyboards
 Stuart "Stu G" Garrard – guitars, programming, additional keyboards, vocals 
 Tim Jupp – acoustic piano, keyboards
 Jon Thatcher – programming, additional keyboards, bass guitar, bass synth, theremin
 Stewart Smith – drums, percussion

Additional musicians
 Sam Gibson – drum programming, additional percussion, loops
 Gerard Le Feuvre – cello (7)
 Sir John Cass's Foundation Primary School Choir – choir (11)
 Pat Bilborough – choir director (11)

Production 
 Martin Smith – producer 
 Stu G – producer 
 Sam Gibson – producer, recording, mixing 
 Christopher Stevens – producer (13), mixing (13)
 Andy Harsant – vocal recording (13)
 Leon Zervos – mastering at Sterling Sound (New York City, New York, USA)
 Les Moir – A&R assistance
 Lynn Nichols – A&R assistance
 Adrian Thompson – A&R assistance
 Chris York – A&R assistance
 Mark Debnam – creative director, design 
 Stewart Smith – creative director, design 
 David Dobson – photography
 Andy Hutch – photography 
 Sonja Wrethman – photography
 Debbo & Smee – photography

References

Delirious? albums
2008 albums
Sparrow Records albums